Empress Liang (梁皇后) may refer to:

Liang Na (116–150), empress of the Han dynasty, married to Emperor Shun (Liu Bao)
Liang Nüying (died 159), empress of the Han dynasty, married to Emperor Huan (Liu Zhi)
Liang Lanbi ( 305–311), empress of the Jin dynasty
Empress Liang (Former Qin) (died 355), empress of the Former Qin dynasty
Empress Liang (Xia) ( 414), empress of the Xia state during the Sixteen Kingdoms period
Empress Gongsu (died 1085), empress of the Western Xia dynasty, married to Emperor Yizong (Li Liangzuo)
Empress Zhaojian (died 1099), empress of the Western Xia dynasty, married to Emperor Huizong (Li Bingchang)

See also
Queen Liang ( 429), queen of the Western Qin state

Liang